It is important to distinguish between awards, honors, and membership levels in the Order of the Arrow – the honor camping society of the Boy Scouts of America. The Founder's Award, the Red Arrow Award, and the Distinguished Service Award are all awards. Any of the awards of the Order of the Arrow (OA) may be presented to an individual regardless of which membership level they have achieved. The Vigil Honor may only be bestowed upon Brotherhood Members.

Individual Honors

Vigil Honor

The Vigil Honor was first bestowed upon E. Urner Goodman by the Unami Lodge in 1915, and has since been conferred annually as a national recognition upon OA members for noteworthy service to others through the OA and Scouting. New Vigil Honor members are nominated, approved, and inducted annually in all current OA lodges.

Lodges nominate Brotherhood members for the Vigil Honor according to specific national requirements, with nominations limited according to lodge size and a balance between youth and adult members. Those members whose lodges' nominations have been approved by the National OA office are inducted during a special ceremony, and are bestowed with a name of honor translated in both a Native American/American Indian language as well as English. Recipients also are given a different sash, similar to the Brotherhood sash but with a triangle with three small arrows in the middle of the main arrow. The National OA office issues a Vigil Honor certificate recognizing this honor with the honoree's given name and the Vigil Honor name in both translations.

Individual Awards

Lifetime achievement award
The Legacy of Servant Leadership Lifetime Achievement Award was created by the National Order of the Arrow Committee in 2002 to recognize the Order's second and third generation "Founders" - Scouters who have built an enduring legacy to Scouting and the Order of the Arrow through a lifetime of cheerful service to others.

The award is intended to recognize only those extraordinary Arrowmen who have deeply influenced and significantly contributed to the vision, direction, and growth of the Order of the Arrow, faithfully demonstrated a lifetime of servant leadership, and, through their daily example, illuminated and reinforced the significance of the values found in the Scout Oath and Scout Law.

The prestige of the award requires the criteria be general in nature to allow members of the National Committee to exercise wisdom, flexibility, and discretion in the evaluation and selection of a worthy recipient. Although any past or present member of the Order of the Arrow may be nominated, a nominee must meet the following criteria:
 Vigil Honor recipient;
 National Distinguished Service Award (DSA) recipient;
 Continued to render outstanding and dedicated service to the Order of the Arrow on a sectional, regional, or national level, since receiving the DSA; and
 Member of the Order of the Arrow for a minimum of 25 years.

Nominations are made using the Lifetime Achievement Award Nomination Form, and must be received in the national office prior to October 31 of the year prior to a National Order of the Arrow Conference ("NOAC"). Nominations will be submitted to members of the Recognition & Awards Subcommittee for evaluation and recommendation to the National Committee. A nominee must be approved by 75% of the members of National Committee to receive the award. The award will be presented only at NOAC.

Given the nature and prestige of the award, it is recommended that no more than one recipient be recognized at a NOAC. The award recipient will be notified prior to the award ceremony. The award may not be presented posthumously.

In keeping with the nature of the award, the recognition is not to be a uniform piece, pin, ribbon, or other device, but will be a significant recognition suitable for display in the recipient's home or office. The honorees are:
 2002 Thomas McBride
 2004 Carl M. Marchetti, M.D.
 2006 Dabney Kennedy
 2009 Del Loder
 2012 Ed Pease
 2018 Bradley Haddock

At the 2018 National Planning Meeting, the National Order of the Arrow Committee voted unanimously to retire the Lifetime Achievement Award and affirm the Distinguished Service Award as the highest award presented by the Order of the Arrow for sectional, regional, and national service.

Distinguished Service Award

The Distinguished Service Award (DSA) is a service recognition award for those who have rendered distinguished and outstanding service to the OA on a sectional, regional, or national basis over a period of years.

The first awards were presented at Camp Twin Echo, Pennsylvania, to E. Urner Goodman, Carroll A. Edson, and eight others at the 1940 national meeting. Between 1940 and the first national conference in 1948, the award was presented at national meetings as deserving individuals were found. Thereafter, the award presentation became a traditional part of the pageantry and ceremony of the national conference.

Since the time of the first awards in 1940, just over 1000 Distinguished Service Awards have been presented. This alone is a testament to its high standard of excellence. The award is a sterling silver arrowhead, bearing an arrow pointing upward and to the wearer's right, suspended from a white neck-ribbon upon which are embroidered red arrows (the first awards were suspended from a forest green ribbon – the current ribbon has been in use since the 1960s). A white square knot embroidered upon red cloth is available for uniform wear, and a miniature silver arrowhead lapel pin is available for civilian wear.

Presentation of the award is limited. Arrowmen whose service records are the most outstanding and extend farthest beyond others are usually selected. Nominations are open to both youth and adult Arrowmen.

Red Arrow Award

The Red Arrow Award, is similar in nature to the Distinguished Service Award, but unlike the more renowned award, the Red Arrow Award is given to non-members only. It was first awarded in 1970. Because some of those honored were women who have since joined the OA, (female Scouters too are now eligible to be nominated for membership), these are the only OA members who have received it.

Founder's Award

The Order of the Arrow Founder's Award was first introduced at the 1981 National Order of the Arrow Conference (NOAC), following the death of Goodman. This award honors Arrowmen in the Order of the Arrow (OA) for unselfish service above and beyond their normal duties to their lodge. Any lodge may present the award to up to two arrowmen annually; lodges with more than 1,000 members may present up to three awards, and lodges with more than 1,500 members may present up to four awards. No lodge may present more than four awards. If more than one Founder's Award is presented, at least one must be presented to a youth member under the age of 21. Lodges are not required to give the Founder's Award if they feel that no one is worthy of it. A member may only receive the award once in their lifetime.
The award is a bronze medallion bearing the images of Goodman and Edson. The reverse of the medallion reads "For he who serves his fellows, is of all his fellows, greatest" which was Goodman's prime reason for starting the Order of the Arrow. The recipient may also wear a red OA Pocket Device with a gold arrow, instead of the red and white one with a silver arrow. The recipient is also presented with a certificate detailing his name and lodge.

OA Triple Crown Award

First given in 2005, this award is given to youth Arrowmen who have attended and completed three out of the five Order of the Arrow High Adventure programs at the national high adventure bases in the Boy Scouts of America. It is one of the national awards given by the Order of the Arrow to members while they are still youth. This award is not the official Triple Crown of High Adventure award that is awarded by Charles L. Sommers Alumni Association, Inc. (Northern Tier’s alumni association) in conjunction with the Boy Scouts of America. However, those who have completed Order of the Arrow High Adventure programs at three National High Adventure Bases may qualify for the official Triple Crown of High Adventure award.

Centurion Award
Introduced for the centennial year of the Order of the Arrow, the Centurion Award was a one-time only award created to recognize Arrowmen who meaningfully contributed to the forming, maturing, or ongoing operation of their lodge. Recipients were designated as either a youth or adult contributor, with a minimum service period of three years for youth contributors and six years for adult contributors. Posthumous awards were permitted.

Lodges selected over 1,800 Arrowmen for the award. Recipients received a certificate and a metallic centennial totem suspended from a red and white neck-ribbon.

Leadership in Service Award
Between 2005 and 2007, the National Order of the Arrow Committee created the Leadership in Service Award to recognize both youth and adult members completing a set number of hours of service on community and lodge levels. The award was given over three years with first year recipients receiving a red acrylic pocket arrow suspended from on a blue device and second and third year recipients receiving silver and gold palms, respectively.

Lodge Awards

E. Urner Goodman Camping Award

Each year since 1969, the National Council of the Order of the Arrow selects two lodges from each of the (currently two) regions to receive the E. Urner Goodman Camping Award. This award recognizes lodges that have made outstanding contributions to promoting (and increasing) camping within their host council. Also considered is the number of Arrowmen who serve on their council's summer camp staff.

National Service Award

Begun in 1999, the National Service Award recognizes four Lodges each year whose service work is exemplary in both quality and quantity. The Lodge must petition for the award and show proof of their accomplishments, in addition to being certified a Quality Lodge for that year.

Scholarships

E. Urner Goodman Scholarship Fund
The E. Urner Goodman Scholarship is awarded annually by the Boy Scouts of America to members of the Order of the Arrow who are preparing for a professional career in Scouting. The scholarships are provided to help cover the financial costs of a college education. These scholarships have been suspended by the National Order of the Arrow Committee.

Josh Sain Memorial Scholarship
This scholarship was established in 1998 to honor the spirit and the memory of Josh Sain, a former National Vice Chief of the Order of the Arrow. The scholarships are provided to immediate past national officers, immediate past region chiefs, and immediate past section chiefs, upon completion of their successful service of their terms. All awards are selected on merit and based on performance in their respective roles and academic achievements while serving in one of the roles mentioned above.

See also

References

External links

 Vigil Honor at National OA Site
 Petition for E. Urner Goodman Camping Award

Order of the Arrow
Advancement and recognition in the Boy Scouts of America